The Grès verts hevétiques is a geologic formation in France. It preserves fossils dating back to the Cretaceous period.

See also

 List of fossiliferous stratigraphic units in France

References
 

Cretaceous France